The Aparam is a river of south-eastern New Ireland. It flows into the sea to the north of Maliom.

References

Rivers of New Ireland Province